George Robert Wendt Jr. (born October 17, 1948) is an American actor and comedian. He is best known for playing Norm Peterson on the television sitcom Cheers (1982–1993), which earned him six consecutive nominations for the Primetime Emmy Award for Outstanding Supporting Actor in a Comedy Series. He also played the role in the short-lived spin-off The Tortellis and in an episode of Wings, which was made by the same creators. Wendt has also appeared in his own sitcom, The George Wendt Show, following Cheers, but it was cancelled after only a few episodes. His numerous film roles include Fletch, Gung Ho, Dreamscape, House, Forever Young, Hostage for a Day, Man of the House, and Lakeboat.

Early life
George Robert Wendt Jr. was born in the Beverly neighborhood on the south side of Chicago, Illinois. His parents were Loretta Mary (née Howard) and George Robert Wendt, an officer in the Navy and a realtor. He is one of nine children, with six sisters—Nancy, Karen, Mary Ann, Kathryn, Loretta, and Marti—as well as two brothers, Tom and Paul. His maternal grandfather was photographer Tom Howard. Wendt is of Irish and one quarter German descent.

He attended Campion High School in Prairie du Chien, Wisconsin. He was expelled from the University of Notre Dame after he received a 0.00 GPA the first semester of his junior year. He later attended the Jesuit Rockhurst College in Kansas City, Missouri, where he graduated with a B.A. in economics.

Wendt is an uncle of actor and former SNL writer and cast member Jason Sudeikis, his sister's son.

Career

Early career
Wendt is a 1975 alumnus of The Second City, which he discovered shortly after college. A viewing had inspired him to join and on his first day of employment, he showed up promptly at 11:30 am as he was instructed. The woman working there handed him a broom and said "Welcome to the theater, kid"; thus, his first job in show business was sweeping the floors. Second City was also where he met his future wife, Bernadette Birkett, who played Cliff's Halloween date in the third season of Cheers and later in the series played the voice of Norm's never-seen wife, Vera.

Wendt appeared in the 1980 film My Bodyguard, and had small roles in the TV series Taxi, Soap, and M*A*S*H.

Cheers

From 1982 to 1993, Wendt appeared as Norm Peterson in all 275 episodes of Cheers. For his work on Cheers, Wendt earned six Primetime Emmy Award nominations for Best Supporting Actor in a Comedy Series. He also played the role in the short-lived spin-off The Tortellis and in an episode of Wings, which was made by the same creators.

Post-Cheers

His first appearance on Saturday Night Live was in a season 11 (1985–1986) episode where he shared hosting duties with director Francis Ford Coppola. In 1988 he played the part of "Witten" in the New Zealand-made film, Never Say Die. In the early 1990s, Wendt made cameo appearances on several episodes of SNL as Bob Swerski, one of the Chicago Superfans (along with cast members Chris Farley, Mike Myers, Robert Smigel, and one-time host, Joe Mantegna). Having grown up as a lifelong fan of his hometown Chicago White Sox and Chicago Bears, Wendt's Bob Swerski character is said to be a "spot-on" characterization of Chicago's south-side citizens.

In 1989, Wendt appeared as the eponymous protagonist in a BBC TV dramatization of Ivan Goncharov's novel Oblomov. He has also appeared twice on the original British edition of Whose Line Is It Anyway? In 1991, Wendt played the father in Michael Jackson's music video "Black or White". He had roles opposite Robert De Niro in 1991's Guilty by Suspicion and with Mel Gibson in 1992's Forever Young.

Following his success on Cheers, Wendt starred in the short-lived The George Wendt Show, which featured him as a garage mechanic with a radio show, based on the NPR radio show Car Talk. The George Wendt Show aired from March through April, 1995.

Wendt starred as the killer in one of the last episodes of the TV series Columbo, portraying a thoroughbred horse owner in the 1995 episode Strange Bedfellows. Wendt appeared as himself on Seinfeld and has reprised the character Norm Peterson on The Simpsons episode "Fear of Flying", two episodes of Family Guy, "Road to Rupert" and "Three Kings", as well as the Frasier episode "Cheerful Goodbyes". In the same year as his Frasier guest appearance, Wendt played the bartender to Ted Danson's character in Becker (the inverse of their relationship on Cheers). In 1994, he appeared in the film Man of the House as Chet Bronski, the stepfather of Norman (Zachary Browne), and starred with Chevy Chase, Jonathan Taylor Thomas and Farrah Fawcett. He also played the role of Old Man Dunphy's closeted homosexual friend Joey in the 1999 film Outside Providence.

In 1998, he was one of the three characters in a London West End production of 'Art' with David Dukes and Stacy Keach. He would later join the Broadway production of the play, starring alongside Judd Hirsch and Joe Morton.

In 2003, Wendt appeared as a celebrity fisherman in the music video for Cobra Verde's "Riot Industry" along with Rudy Ray Moore (of "Dolemite" fame) and The Minutemen's Mike Watt. He appeared in several episodes of The WB's Sabrina, The Teenage Witch in 2001 as the title character's boss. He also was the host of the A&E reality show House of Dreams in 2004. In January 2006, Wendt was seen again on television screens as part of the cast of Modern Men.

He has also appeared on The Larry Sanders Show as a guest on the show. In 2006, Wendt made several appearances on Late Night with Conan O'Brien where he performed short skits. His appearances on Late Night were in all likelihood because the show was having a week-long event in his home town of Chicago. He starred in a 2006 episode of Masters of Horror entitled "Family", directed by John Landis, and played Santa Claus in the ABC Family original film Santa Baby. Wendt performed alongside Richard Thomas in Twelve Angry Men in October 2006 in the Eisenhower Theatre in Washington, D.C.. After the show opened, Wendt was interviewed by local film critic Arch Campbell for a piece on the NBC Washington affiliate WRC. Wendt was asked, "What should people do when they see you around town?" After hesitating for a moment, Wendt held his thumbs up and replied, "If their impulse is to buy me a beer, then by all means, follow that impulse." In spring 2007, Wendt performed in 12 Angry Men in Los Angeles. Wendt appeared as an American GI in the 2007 Christmas Special episode of British sitcom The Green Green Grass.

George starred in the Broadway musical Hairspray as the character of Edna Turnblad until November 2008. He appeared with his former Cheers co-star John Ratzenberger as a talent scout on Last Comic Standing during Season 6. He briefly appeared as Santa Claus in A Colbert Christmas: The Greatest Gift of All!. He also appeared in the 2008 horror film Bryan Loves You directed by Seth Landau.

On October 1, 2009, Wendt appeared on The Colbert Report the day before the IOC announced which city will host the 2016 Summer Olympics. In their way of supporting Chicago's bid for the games, Wendt and Stephen Colbert humorously insulted the three other bidding cities, Rio de Janeiro, Madrid, and Tokyo, all while drinking Chicago's favorite Old Style Beer. In 2009, Wendt starred as Santa Claus in Santa Buddies and also had a small role in the film Opposite Day.

2010s
Wendt appeared in a production of Hairspray, reprising his role as Edna Turnblad, from September 8 to October 9, 2010, at the Charlottetown Festival in Prince Edward Island, Canada. Wendt played Santa in Elf the Musical on Broadway. The show opened November 14, 2010, and ran through January 2, 2011. Wendt starred in a production of Hairspray as Edna Turnblad at Rainbow Stage in Winnipeg, Manitoba, Canada, from August 2, 2011, to August 21, 2011. Wendt also guest-starred in the TV series Hot In Cleveland as Yoder, based on his character Norm in Cheers. His first of two scenes took place in an Amish bar, where everyone in the bar yelled "Yoder!", referencing what the cast of Cheers would yell whenever he walked in.

Wendt is among the thespians who participated in a poster campaign touting live theatre in Chicago. Other celebrities included John Mahoney, John Malkovich, Terry Kinney, and Martha Plimpton. Wendt has a cameo as a newspaper reporter on Portlandia on January 25, 2013. Wendt was set to play the role of Pap in the Hank Williams bio musical Lost Highway at the Merry-Go-Round Playhouse in Auburn, New York.

Beginning in the fall of 2013, Wendt appeared in a television commercial for State Farm Insurance. Wendt and Robert Smigel reprise their roles from SNL as the Chicago Superfans, who encounter quarterback Aaron Rodgers. The commercial continued the theme of State Farm commercials featuring Rodgers, using the  "discount doublecheck" slogan.

From November 6, 2013, to January 19, 2014, Wendt starred in Never Too Late, a comedy with his wife, actress Bernadette Birkett, at New Theatre Restaurant in Overland Park, Kansas. In this play, Wendt plays a successful lumber yard owner who is king of his castle and whose life is going exactly the way he wants until his wife comes back from a doctor appointment with some big news.

In 2015, Wendt starred opposite his former Second City co-star Tim Kazurinsky in Bruce Graham's new comedy Funnyman at Northlight Theatre. The same year, Wendt appeared in the TBS sitcom Clipped, which aired for one season.

Wendt appeared as Tracy Turnblad's mother in a production of Hairspray featuring John Waters and the Baltimore Symphony Orchestra in Baltimore in June 2016.

Wendt starred in The Fabulous Lipitones at New Theatre Restaurant in Overland Park, Kansas from November 30, 2016, to February 12, 2017.

Wendt starred as Willy Loman in Death of a Salesman at St. Jacob's Country Playhouse in Waterloo, Ontario, Canada, from October 18 to November 4, 2017.

Personal life
Wendt is married to Bernadette Birkett, and has three children: Hilary, Joe, and Daniel.

Filmography

Film

Television

Music videos

References

External links

 
 
 
 
 George Wendt cast bio on The WB
 2009 interview with Bullz-Eye.com

1948 births
20th-century American male actors
21st-century American male actors
American male film actors
American male television actors
American people of German descent
American people of Irish descent
Living people
Male actors from Chicago
Rockhurst University alumni
University of Notre Dame alumni